Kazakhstan participated at the 2017 Summer Universiade which was held in Taipei, Taiwan.

Kazakhstan sent a delegation consisting of only 122 competitors for the event competing 13 sporting events. Kazakhstan claimed 16 medals at the multi-sport event.

References 

Nations at the 2017 Summer Universiade
2017 in Kazakhstani sport
2017